In the number theory of integer partitions, the numbers  denote both the number of partitions of  into exactly  parts (that is, sums of  positive integers that add to ), and the number of partitions of  into parts of maximum size exactly . These two types of partition are in bijection with each other, by a diagonal reflection of their Young diagrams. Their numbers can be arranged into a triangle, the triangle of partition numbers, in which the th row gives the partition numbers :

Recurrence relation
Analogously to Pascal's triangle, these numbers may be calculated using the recurrence relation

As base cases, and any value on the right hand side of the recurrence that would be outside the triangle can be taken as zero.

Row sums and diagonals
In the triangle of partition numbers, the sum of the numbers in the th row is the partition number . These numbers form the sequence

omitting the initial value  of the partition numbers.
Each diagonal from upper left to lower right is eventually constant, with the constant parts of these diagonals extending approximately from halfway across each row to its end. The values of these constants are the partition numbers 1, 1, 2, 3, 5, 7, ... again.

References

Triangles of numbers
Integer partitions